Sri Lanka competed at the 2019 World Aquatics Championships in Gwangju, South Korea from 12 to 28 July.

Swimming

Sri Lanka qualified four swimmers. One swimmer did not participated.

Men

Women

References

Nations at the 2019 World Aquatics Championships
2019 in Sri Lankan sport
Sri Lanka at the World Aquatics Championships